The Piriá River is a river in the extreme east of the state of Pará, Brazil.

The river rises in the municipality of Nova Esperança do Piriá, and flows past the municipal seat of Nova Esperança do Piriá.
It flows in a generally northeast direction.
The lower reaches of the river before it enters the Atlantic Ocean are protected by the Gurupi-Piriá Marine Extractive Reserve.

See also
List of rivers of Pará

Notes

Sources

Rivers of Pará